= George Spanach =

Canadian football player

Profile
- Positions: Guard, Tackle

Personal information
- Born: 1943 or 1944 (age 81–82)
- Listed height: 6 ft 1 in (1.85 m)
- Listed weight: 235 lb (107 kg)

Career history
- 1966–1967: Edmonton Eskimos
- 1967: Montreal Alouettes

George Spanach (born 1943 or 1944) is a Canadian football player who played for the Edmonton Eskimos and Montreal Alouettes.
